British Museum Act is a stock short title used in the United Kingdom for legislation relating to the British Museum.

List
The British Museum Act 1753 (26 Geo 2 c 22)
The British Museum Act 1767 (7 Geo 3 c 18)
The British Museum Act 1805 (45 Geo 3 c 127)
The British Museum Act 1807 (47 Geo 3 sess 2 c 36)
The British Museum Act 1816 (56 Geo 3 c 99)
The British Museum Act 1824 (5 Geo 4 c 39)
The British Museum (No. 2) Act 1824 (5 Geo 4 c 60)
The British Museum Act 1832 (2 & 3 Will 4 c 46)
The British Museum Act 1878 (41 & 42 Vict c 55)
The British Museum (Purchase of Land) Act 1894 (57 & 58 Vict c 34)
The British Museum Act 1902 (2 Edw 7 c 12)
The British Museum Act 1924 (14 & 15 Geo 5 c 23)
The British Museum Act 1930 (20 & 21 Geo 5 c 46)
The British Museum Act 1932 (22 & 23 Geo 5 c 34)
The British Museum Act 1938 (1 & 2 Geo 6 c 62)
The British Museum Act 1955 (3 & 4 Eliz 2 c 23)
The British Museum Act 1962 (10 & 11 Eliz 2 c 18)
The British Museum Act 1963 (c 24)

See also
List of short titles
British Museum Act 1839 (2 & 3 Vict c 10) 
Copyright (British Museum) Act 1915 (5 & 6 Geo 5 c 38)

Lists of legislation by short title